Raquel Pélissier (born August 21, 1991) is a Haitian model and beauty pageant titleholder who won Miss Haiti 2016. She represented Port-au-Prince at the pageant and represented Haiti at Miss Universe 2016 where she ended as 1st Runner-Up, being the first Haitian delegate to place in the finals in 41 years, with their last placement being back in 1975.

Personal life
Pélissier was born in Haiti. At the age of three, Pélissier was in a twenty-one day coma, came out of it and was paralyzed for a week. She later survived the 2010 Haiti earthquake.

Pélissier started doing photo shoots for local magazine Rebelle Haiti, then lost to France's Iris Mittenaere, the eventual winner in Miss Universe 2016, held in Manila, Philippines. Post-Miss Universe, Pélissier has done several pageant-related videos on her YouTube channel, which has almost 7,000 subscribers.

Pélissier has a master's degree in Scientific Research from Universidad Complutense in Madrid, Spain. She is fluent in English and Spanish, alongside her native tongues of French and Haitian Creole.

References

1991 births
Living people
People from Port-au-Prince
Haitian beauty pageant winners
Haitian female models
Miss Universe 2016 contestants
Complutense University of Madrid alumni